John Birmingham (born 1953) is a British-born Falkland Islands politician who served as a Member of the Legislative Assembly for the Stanley constituency from a by-election in 2008 until the 2009 general election. Birmingham was elected as a Member of the Legislative Council, which was reconstituted into the Legislative Assembly with the implementation of the 2009 Constitution. He was previously a Member of the Legislative Council from 1994–2005.

Birmingham was born in England and educated at Chichester College. At the age of seventeen, he joined the British Merchant Navy. Four years later he left the Navy and travelled to the Falklands to work on a Camp sheep farm. After touring mainland South America, he returned to the islands where he married Louise, and in 1988 the couple moved to Stanley.

Birmingham was first elected to the Legislative Council in a 1994 by-election and was re-elected in 1997 and 2001, but lost his seat in 2005. He returned to the Legislative Council at a by-election in 2008 to fill the seat left vacant by Richard Davies, but he lost his seat again in the 2009 general election.

References

1953 births
Living people
British Merchant Navy personnel
Falkland Islands businesspeople
Falkland Islands Councillors 1993–1997
Falkland Islands Councillors 1997–2001
Falkland Islands Councillors 2001–2005
Falkland Islands Councillors 2005–2009
Falkland Islands MLAs 2021–2025
People from Salford
English emigrants to the Falkland Islands